Harijesy Razafindramahatra is a Malagasy Olympic swimmer. She represented her country in the Women's 100 metre backstroke at the 1996 Summer Olympics. Her time in the heats was a 1:13.83

References

1977 births
Living people
Malagasy female swimmers
Olympic swimmers of Madagascar
Swimmers at the 1996 Summer Olympics
Female backstroke swimmers